The Sarmiento House is a National Historic Monument in the northern suburb of Tigre, Buenos Aires, Argentina. It was the former residence from 1855 until his death in 1888 of Domingo Sarmiento, the 7th President of Argentina. It was declared a National Historic Monument in 1966 and is now a museum.

See also
Sarmiento historic museum

External links
 
welcomeargentina.com 

Museums in Buenos Aires
Tigre, Buenos Aires
National Historic Monuments of Argentina
Domingo Faustino Sarmiento